Dilla may refer to:

 Dilla, a city of Somaliland
 Dilla District, a district of Somaliland whose capital is Dilla
 Dila, Ethiopia, a city of Ethiopia
 Dilla University, a university in the Ethiopian city
 Dilla (month), the ninth month in the Nepal Era calendar
 Dilla (slang), a slang term used in surfing
 J Dilla (1974–2006), an American hip hop producer